Jolie is a female given name of French origin, and its meaning is pretty. The name derives from the French word "joli, jolif" which in turn derives from the Latin "gaudēre > gaudĕo", meaning "joy, contentment, enjoyment, expressions of joy, pleasure, satisfaction". It can be also spelled as Jolee or Joli.

Jolie is also a surname. Notable people with the name include:

Surname
Angelina Jolie (born Angelina Jolie Voight in 1975), American actress
Jade Jolie, American drag queen
Ruud Jolie, the main guitarist of the Dutch symphonic metal band Within Temptation

Given name
Jolie, a nickname of entertainer Al Jolson 
Jolie Christine Rickman, a feminist and social activist 
Jolie Gabor, known as "Mama Jolie", the mother of sisters Zsa Zsa, Eva and Magda Gabor

See also
, a Design 1022 cargo ship in service 1917–1944

English feminine given names
Feminine given names